ZSU may refer to: 

 Armed Forces of Ukraine (Ukrainian: Zbroini syly Ukrainy)
 Self-propelled anti-aircraft weapon (Russian: Zenitnaya Samokhodnaya Ustanovka)
 ZSU-37, based on the chassis of the SU-76M and developed by the end of 1943
 ZSU-57-2, developed by the 1950s, twin 57mm autocannon
 ZSU-23-4, successor of the ZSU-57-2, four barrel 23mm autocannon
 ZSU-23-4MP Biała, Polish modification of the ZSU-23-4
 Sun Yat-sen University (Zhong Shan University, in Chinese)
 Z Special Unit, a World War II unit